The Ocilla and Irwinville Railroad was incorporated on October 4, 1900, and began operations the same year, operating an 11-mile line between Ocilla, Georgia, and Irwinville, Georgia.  It had only one locomotive and the railroad was purchased on February 19, 1903, by the Brunswick and Birmingham Railroad.  By 1916, the line was abandoned.

References

Ocilla and Irwinville Railroad (RailGA)

Defunct Georgia (U.S. state) railroads
Predecessors of the Atlantic Coast Line Railroad
Railway companies established in 1900
Railway companies disestablished in 1903
American companies disestablished in 1903